Strzelniki  is a village in the administrative district of Gmina Lewin Brzeski, within Brzeg County, Opole Voivodeship, in south-western Poland.

The village is home to St. Anthony of Padua Church, exhibiting Medieval polychromes on the entire interior of the church.

The village has a population of 450.

See also
St. Anthony of Padua Church, Strzelniki

References

Strzelniki